Fernando Cordero Rusque (died 24 January 2020) was a Chilean military officer and politician who served as the General Director of Carabineros and as a Senator.

References

Date of birth missing
2020 deaths
Chilean politicians
General Directors of Carabineros de Chile